The communauté de communes d’Évaux-les-Bains Chambon-sur-Voueize  was located in the Creuse département of the Limousin  region of central France. It was created in January 2002. It was merged into the new Communauté de communes Creuse Confluence in January 2017.

It comprised the following 13 communes:

Auge
Budelière 
Chambonchard
Chambon-sur-Voueize
Évaux-les-Bains
Lépaud
Lussat
Nouhant
Saint-Julien-la-Genête
Saint-Priest
Tardes
Verneiges
Viersat

See also
Communes of the Creuse department

References 

Evaux-les-Bains